The Daily Alfazl is one of the oldest dailies in the Indian Subcontinent. It is the Official Ahmadiyya organ. It was initiated by Mirza Basheer-ud-Din Mahmood Ahmad on June 18, 1913. Mahmud was then a young man of 24. The Daily has completed 100 years of its continuous publication. (Except for the short interruptions when the military dictator Gen Muhammad Zia-ul-Haq banned its publications from 1984-1988). The initial monetary responsibilities were fulfilled through donations by members of the Ahmadiyya Muslim Community. The wife of Hakeem Noor-ud-Din, Khalifatul Masih I, ‘Ummi Nasir’ donated Rs. 500. The wife of Mirza Ghulam Ahmad, Nusrat Jahan Begum donated Rs. 1000. Another notable Ahmadi, son in law of Mirza Ghulam Ahmad, Nawab Muhammad Ali Khan donated Rs 1300.

Mirza Basheer-ud-Din Mahmood Ahmad remained its Publisher and Printer for the first few years. The first “Katib” (scribe) was one Muhammad Hussain, the Manager was Mirza Abdul Ghafur Bag. The editorial staff included Qazi Zuhoor ud Akmal, Soofi Ghulam Muhammad and Master Abdur Rahim Nayyar, notable Ahmadis of that time. The house of Nawab Muhammad Ali Khan, remained the active working place of the nascent ‘Alfazl’. At present the daily gets actively published from Rabwah Pakistan, as well as a weekly edition is published from London (UK). The past papers have been saved at an archive.

References

Ahmadiyya literature
Urdu-language newspapers published in Pakistan
Newspapers established in 1913
Daily newspapers published in Pakistan